Daniel Wyllie (born 1970) is an Australian stage, film and television actor. Wyllie began acting in theatre.

Early life
Wyllie grew up on Sydney's North Shore. He attended North Sydney Boys High School and the University of New South Wales, where he studied arts for two years. Although he took part in amateur productions with the Australian Theatre for Young People (ATYP), and while his involvement led to professional work, Wyllie considers himself untrained.

When he was 18, Wyllie was involved in a car accident which knocked out his front four teeth and left him with a facial scar on his mouth.

Career
Wyllie primarily works in theatre, having appeared in many productions over the past two decades. He has performed frequently with the Sydney company Company B Belvoir, having appeared in productions of plays such as The Lieutenant of Inishmore, The Pillowman and, creating the role of Fish Lamb in the landmark production of Cloudstreet, which toured both nationally and internationally.

His first major acting role was in the 1992 film Spotswood, alongside Anthony Hopkins, Ben Mendelsohn, Russell Crowe and Toni Collette. Later in 1992, he played neo-Nazi skinhead Cackles in Romper Stomper alongside Crowe, who got Wyllie his first agent. He counts actress Toni Collette as a close friend, and appeared with her in the films Muriel's Wedding and Così.

In 2003 he appeared in the almost Long take video clip for The Sleepy Jackson Good Dancers (2003).

Wyllie's television work includes Bastard Boys, Bad Cop, Bad Cop,  Underbelly and The Code. From 2005 – 2007, he had the role of Charlie Jackson in the drama series Love My Way, for which he received a Silver Logie for "Most Outstanding Actor in a Drama Series" in 2004. He also received Australian Film Institute Awards nominations in 2005, 2006 and 2007.

In 2010, he appeared in the role of Ezra White (one he had previously played in short drama film Ezra White, LL.B.), the central family's lawyer, in the Australian crime drama Animal Kingdom.

In 2011, Wyllie joined the cast of Tangle as a guest star playing Michael Chubievsky in series three.

In 2012 he appeared in Puberty Blues in the role of Roger Knight and in The Straits as Jojo.

In 2013, he appeared in Rake (third series) as Cleaver's sensitive cell mate, Mal, who fears release.

In 2016 he appeared in Foxtel's political thriller, Secret City as Mal Paxton, a minister in the Australian Government.

In 2021 he appeared in Wakefield as James Matos, a businessman who continues to negotiate a property deal while a hospital patient.

Filmography

Film

Television

References

External links

1970 births
Australian male film actors
Australian male television actors
Australian male stage actors
Living people
Logie Award winners
People educated at North Sydney Boys High School
20th-century Australian male actors
21st-century Australian male actors
Male actors from Sydney